Otto Ernst Lubitz (1896  1943) was a German screenwriter, film producer and production manager. During the 1930s he worked for the Munich-based Bavaria Film. He later became part of the Berlin Film group of independent producers.

Selected filmography
 A Woman Like You (1933)
 The Fugitive from Chicago (1934)
 The Legacy of Pretoria (1934)
 The Fight with the Dragon (1935)
 The King's Prisoner (1935)
 The Three Around Christine (1936)
 The Glass Ball (1937)
 The Model Husband (1937)
 Marionette (1939)
 Wild Bird (1943)

References

Bibliography
 Ulrich J. Klaus. Deutsche Tonfilme: Filmlexikon der abendfüllenden deutschen und deutschsprachigen Tonfilme nach ihren deutschen Uraufführungen, Volume 9. Klaus-Archiv, 2006.

External links

1896 births
1943 deaths
Film people from Berlin